Jordi Delclos (born 3 July 1985) is a retired French professional footballer who played as an attacking midfielder.

External links
 
 
 Jordi Delclos profile at foot-national.com
 

1985 births
Living people
Sportspeople from Perpignan
French footballers
French expatriate footballers
French expatriate sportspeople in Switzerland
Footballers from Occitania (administrative region)
Association football midfielders
RCO Agde players
SO Cassis Carnoux players
Gap HAFC players
ÉFC Fréjus Saint-Raphaël players
AC Arlésien players
FC Lausanne-Sport players
US Orléans players
Bergerac Périgord FC players
Canet Roussillon FC players
Ligue 2 players
Swiss Challenge League players
Expatriate footballers in Switzerland
Championnat National players
Championnat National 2 players
Championnat National 3 players